The term anterior horn (also frontal horn, anterior cornu, frontal cornu) may refer to either of two separate anatomical structures within the central nervous system: 

anterior horn of lateral ventricle in the brain, which passes forward, laterally, and slightly downward from the interventricular foramen into the frontal lobe
anterior horn of spinal cord, the ventral (front) grey matter section of the spinal cord which contains motor neurons that affect the skeletal muscles

See also
Posterior horn (disambiguation)